The Berlin Bruisers are a gay and inclusive rugby club based in Berlin, Germany. They were founded in 2012, and are the first team of its kind in Germany. Although they are a primarily gay rugby team, the club is open to anyone with an interest in playing rugby and includes members of all sexualities and gender identities.

The club is affiliated with International Gay Rugby.

The Berlin Bruisers play in the German Rugby-Regionalliga North-East. They also participate in the Union Cup, and the Bingham Cup.

History 
The Berlin Bruisers were founded in 2012 by Dave Egan. Their first training ground was at Tiergarten, and Tempelhofer Feld, with Michael Felts as coach.

The first match was a friendly game against the Emerald Warriors on 16 March 2013 at Tempelhofer Feld, and was lost 45–22.

Their first official match took place at Union Cup 2013 in Bristol against the Stockholm Berserkers.

They are also participated in the Union Cup (2013-Bristol, 2015-Brüssel, 2017-Madrid, 2019-Dublin), and the Bingham Cup (2018-Amsterdam).

First trainings were at Tiergarten, Volkspark Friedrichshain and Tempelhofer Feld (coach: Michael Felts), later at Berliner Sport-Club (coach: Santiago Rubio, Rodolfo Antonini), and since the season 2019/20 they have formed a joint team with the second team of the Berlin Grizzlies (coach: Rodolfo Antonini).

Crest and colours 
The club colours are dark violet and white. The team crest is a shield with a bandaged head in form of a rugby ball on shoulders.

Bash About 
Since 2014, the Berlin Bruisers have been organised a bi-annual barbarian rugby tournament in Berlin. At the first Bash About,  Gareth Thomas, the Welsh and British Lions international was a guest coach.

Due to the COVID-19 pandemic, the Bash About tournament had to be cancelled in 2020.

Documentary film 
From 2016 to 2017 a documentary film about the Bruisers titled 'Tackling Life' was shot by Johannes List. It premiered in 2018, winning the Audience Award at Dok.fest München 2018
 
and Best Documentary at the First Steps Awards 2018
.
The film was also shown at the Berlinale 2019 in the section Gast der Perspektive Deutsches Kino.

Trivia 

The Bruisers hold the Guinness World record for the most passes thrown per minute (237 Rugby ball passes in 3 Minutes).

In 2018 the Berlin Bruisers performed in the video for the CSD anthem by Maksim Reimer.

In 2019, the club was portrayed in a special edition of Meat Magazine.

References

External links 
 Official website

International Gay Rugby member clubs
German rugby union clubs